Salem Ludwig (July 31, 1915 – April 1, 2007) was an American character actor and highly esteemed acting instructor.

Born in Brooklyn, New York, Ludwig was blacklisted in 1957 and could only find minimal stage work. He had many film and television credits and remained active, even after his 90th birthday, until his death at age 91. A biographical film, An Actor's Life was made by budding director/actress Carol Schaye, who wanted to portray actors as talented, working individuals rather than just the character they see.  He was represented by Theatrical Agent Archer King.

He is known for many films including: Life on the Ledge (2005, Grandfather), Unfaithful (2002, Man with Suitcase), The Business of Strangers (2001, Man at Pool), Fast Food, Fast Women (2000, Leo), The Object of My Affection (1998, Mr Shapiro), I'm Not Rappaport (1996, Walter), For Love Or Money (1993, Customer), Family Business (1989, Nat), Heartburn (1986, Judge), Endless Love (1981, Mr Switzer), The Arab Conspiracy (1976, Ghassan Kaddara), I Love You, Alice B. Toklas (1968, Mr Fine), What's So Bad About Feeling Good? (1968), Three Sisters (1966, Ferapont), America, America (1963, Odysseus Topouzoglou), and Never Love a Stranger (1958, Moishe Moscowitz).

His television roles included attorney Solomon Rabinowitz, in an early episode of All in the Family Rabinowitz memorably advised Archie Bunker not to pursue a whiplash case, telling him "In a court of law, you can't beat a station wagon full of nuns." (The nuns would all have been witnesses against Archie.) He also played Dr. Roth on the NBC-Tv afternoon daytime soap opera The Doctors in 1967.

Filmography

References

External links

Salem Ludwig at the University of Wisconsin's Actors Studio audio collection
Bio

1915 births
2007 deaths
American male film actors
American male television actors
Hollywood blacklist
Male actors from New York City
People from Brooklyn
20th-century American male actors